Maraikayarpattinam is a Panchayat Village near Mandapam in Ramanathapuram district in the Indian state of Tamil Nadu.

References

Villages in Ramanathapuram district